In mathematics and mathematical physics, raising and lowering indices are operations on tensors which change their type.  Raising and lowering indices are a form of index manipulation in tensor expressions.

Vectors, covectors and the metric

Mathematical formulation

The dual space is the space of linear functionals mapping . Concretely, in matrix notation these can be thought of as row vectors, which give a number when applied to column vectors.

Then under a choice of basis , we can view vectors  as an  vector with components  (vectors are taken by convention to have indices up).

For applications, raising and lowering is done using a structure known as the (pseudo-)metric tensor (the 'pseudo-' refers to the fact we allow the metric to be indefinite). Formally, this is a non-degenerate, symmetric bilinear form
 

Raising and lowering vectors and covectors

Raising and lowering is then done in coordinates. Given a vector with components , we can contract with the metric to obtain a covector:

and this is what we mean by lowering the index. Conversely, contracting a covector with the inverse metric gives a vector:

This process is called raising the index.

Raising and then lowering the same index (or conversely) are inverse operations, which is reflected in the metric and inverse metric tensors being inverse to each other (as is suggested by the terminology):

where  is the Kronecker delta or identity matrix.

Finite-dimensional real vector spaces with (pseudo-)metrics are classified up to signature, a coordinate-free property which is well-defined by Sylvester's law of inertia. Possible metrics on real space are indexed by signature . This is a metric associated to  dimensional real space. The metric has signature  if there exists a basis (referred to as an orthonormal basis) such that in this basis, the metric takes the form  with  positive ones and  negative ones. 

Examples: 
  is a model for 3-dimensional space. The metric is equivalent to the standard dot product.
In Euclidean space, raising and lowering is not necessary due to vectors and covector components being the same.
  is Minkowski space (or rather, Minkowski space in a choice of orthonormal basis), a model for spacetime with weak curvature. It is common convention to use greek indices when writing expressions involving tensors in Minkowski space, while Latin indices are reserved for Euclidean space.

Well-formulated expressions are constrained by the rules of Einstein summation: any index may appear at most once and furthermore a raised index must contract with a lowered index. With these rules we can immediately see that an expression such as

is well formulated while

is not.

Example in Minkowski spacetime

The covariant 4-position is given by

with components:

(where ,, are the usual Cartesian coordinates) and the Minkowski metric tensor with metric signature (− + + +) is defined as

in components:

To raise the index, multiply by the tensor and contract:

then for :

and for :

So the index-raised contravariant 4-position is:

This operation is equivalent to the matrix multiplication

By lowering indices, we can write this expression as

What is this in matrix notation? The first expression can be written as

Coordinate free formalism
It is instructive to consider what raising and lowering means in the abstract linear algebra setting. 

We first fix definitions:  is a finite-dimensional vector space over a field .

 is a non-degenerate bilinear form, that is,

is a map which is linear in both arguments, making it a bilinear form. 

By  being non-degenerate we mean that for each , there is a  such that 

In concrete applications,  is often considered a structure on the vector space, for example an inner product or more generally a metric tensor which is allowed to have indefinite signature, or a symplectic form . Together these cover the cases where  is either symmetric or anti-symmetric, but in full generality  need not be either of these cases.

where  denotes an argument which is to be evaluated, and  denotes an argument whose evaluation is deferred.

We made a choice to define this partial evaluation map as being evaluated on the first argument. We could just as well have defined it on the second argument, and non-degeneracy is also independent of argument chosen. Also, when  has well defined (anti-)symmetry, evaluating on either argument is equivalent (up to a minus sign for anti-symmetry).

Non-degeneracy shows that the partial evaluation map is injective, or equivalently that the kernel of the map is trivial. If  is a structure on the vector space sometimes call this the canonical isomorphism .

It therefore has an inverse,  and this is enough to define an associated bilinear form on the dual:

That is,  is the inverse map, while  is the bilinear form.

Checking these expressions in coordinates makes it evident that this is what raising and lowering indices means abstractly.

Tensors

We will not develop the abstract formalism for tensors straightaway. Formally, an  tensor is an object described via its components, and has  components up,  components down. A generic  tensor is written

We can use the metric tensor to raise and lower tensor indices just as we raised and lowered vector indices and raised covector indices.

Examples
 A (0,0) tensor is a number in the field .
 A (1,0) tensor is a vector.
 A (0,1) tensor is a covector.
 A (0,2) tensor is a bilinear form. An example is the metric tensor 
 A (1,1) tensor is a linear map. An example is the delta, which is the identity map, or a Lorentz transformation

Example of raising and lowering

For a (0,2) tensor, twice contracting with the inverse metric tensor and contracting in different indices raises each index:

Similarly, twice contracting with the metric tensor and contracting in different indices lowers each index:

Let's apply this to the theory of electromagnetism.

The contravariant electromagnetic tensor in the  signature is given by

In components,

To obtain the covariant tensor , contract with the inverse metric tensor:

The (covariant) lower indexed tensor is then:

This operation is equivalent to the matrix multiplication

General rank

For a tensor of order , indices are raised by (compatible with above):

and lowered by:

and for a mixed tensor:

We need not raise or lower all indices at once: it is perfectly fine to raise or lower a single index.

See also
 Ricci calculus
 Einstein notation
 Metric tensor
 Musical isomorphism

References